Stein Winge (born 10 November 1940) is a Norwegian stage producer, theatre director and International Emmy Nominated actor.

He has produced numerous plays and operas, and was theatre director at the National Theatre from 1990 to 1992. He was decorated as a Knight, First Class of the Royal Norwegian Order of St. Olav in 2001. He is the son of Sigurd Winge, husband of Kari Onstad and father of Viktoria Winge.

Winge portrayed industrialist Axel Aubert in the 2015 TV series The Heavy Water War.

External link

References

1940 births
Living people
Norwegian theatre directors
Male actors from Oslo